Matt Montgomery may refer to:

Piggy D. (born 1975), American musician
Matt Montgomery (cricketer) (born 2000), South African cricketer